Tariq Christopher Qaiser is a Pakistani politician who had been a member of the National Assembly of Pakistan, from June 2013 to May 2018.

Political career
He was elected to the National Assembly of Pakistan as a candidate of Pakistan Muslim League (N) on a seat reserved for minorities in the 2013 Pakistani general election.

References

Living people
Pakistani MNAs 2013–2018
Pakistani Christians
Pakistan Muslim League (N) politicians
Year of birth missing (living people)